The 1979–80 San Jose State Spartans men's basketball team represented San Jose State University during the 1979–80 NCAA Division I men's basketball season. The Spartans were led by first-year head coach Bill Berry and played their home games at the San Jose Civic Auditorium. SJSU was a member of the Pacific Coast Athletic Association.

The Spartans finished 17–12 overall, and 7–6 in the conference. During the season, San José State was invited and participated in the Cable Car Classic in Santa Clara, California. San José State defeated Virginia and Santa Clara to earn 1st place. San José State also lost to North Texas and Oklahoma City but won against St. Francis Brooklyn to earn 7th place in the All-College Basketball Classic in Oklahoma City, Oklahoma. In the postseason, San José State defeated Pacific, Utah State, and Long Beach State in the 1980 PCAA Conference men's basketball tournament in Anaheim, California. The Spartans were invited and participated in the 1980 NCAA Division I men's basketball tournament, where they lost to Missouri in Lincoln, Nebraska in the first round.

Roster

Bill Berry, Michigan State alumnus, was the Spartans' head coach in 1979–80.

Schedule

|-
!colspan=12 style=| Non-conference regular season

|-
!colspan=12 style=| PCAA regular season

|-
!colspan=12 style=| PCAA tournament
|-

|-
!colspan=12 style=| NCAA tournament

Notes

References

San Jose State Spartans men's basketball seasons
San Jose State
San Jose State